News-Register may refer to one of several newspapers, including:

Aurora News-Register, Aurora, Nebraska
News-Register (McMinnville), McMinnville, Oregon
The Intelligencer and Wheeling News Register, Wheeling, West Virginia